The Tempel Synagogue (Polish: Synagoga Tempel) is a synagogue in Kraków, Poland, in the Kazimierz district.

Tempel Synagogue is not only a major place of worship, but also a booming center of Jewish culture, which hosts numerous concerts and meetings, especially during the Festival.

Overview
The Moorish Revival building was designed by Ignacy Hercok, and built in 1860–1862 along Miodowa Street. The temple, with its tall central section flanked by lower wings, is designed on the pattern of the Leopoldstädter Tempel, in Vienna, Austria.  At the time the synagogue was built, Kraków was part of the Austro-Hungarian Empire.  The richly finished interior is adorned with dense patterns painted in many colors and copious amounts of gold leaf, but the patterns, with the exception of the exquisite Moorish design on the ceiling, are not stylistically Moorish.  The arch over the Aron Kodesh with its pattern of alternating tall and short houses is more in the style of Polish folk art than anything Islamic.  The Aron Kodesh is covered by a gold-leaf dome that evokes the dome over the Sigismund Chapel in the nearby Wawel Cathedral.

The synagogue was ruined during World War II by the German Nazis, who used the building as ammunition storage area. After the war, it was used again for prayers. In 1947, a mikvah was built in the northern part of the synagogue. Regular prayers were held until 1985. A large inflow of financial contributions from private donors around the world allowed the synagogue to undergo a vast renovation from 1995 until 2000. It is still active today, although formal prayers are held only a few times a year.

Gallery

See also 
 Synagogues of Kraków
 Remah Synagogue
 Old Synagogue (Krakow)
 Izaak Synagogue
 Wolf Popper Synagogue
 High Synagogue (Kraków)
 Kupa Synagogue

External links 

 www.JewishKrakow.net - a guide to the Tempel Synagogue as well as Kazimierz in general, Kraków's Jewish quarter
 The Jewish Community of Krakow

Synagogues completed in 1862
Moorish Revival synagogues
Synagogues in Kraków
1862 establishments in the Austrian Empire
Holocaust locations in Poland
Religious organizations established in 1862
19th-century religious buildings and structures in Poland